The 2018 Asia League season consisted of the Summer Super 8 tournament in July and the Terrific 12 tournament in September, which are organized by Asia League Limited.

Summer Super 8
The Summer Super 8, which featured eight teams was held from 17 to 22 July 2018 at the Macau East Asian Games Dome in Cotai, Macau. The Guangzhou Long Lions of the Chinese Basketball Association won over the Seoul Samsung Thunders of the Korean Basketball League in the final.

Group stage

Knock-out stages

Semifinals

Third place

Final

The Terrific 12
The Terrific 12 tournament took place at the Studio City Event Center in Macau from 18 to 23 September. Unlike in the Super Summer 8, imports are eligible to compete in The Terrific 12. The group stage featured four groups of three with the top team advancing to the semifinal.

Group stage

Group A

Group B

Group C

Group D

Knockout stage

Semifinal

Third place

Final

Summer Super 8 Coaches' Clinic 
The Summer Super 8 Coaches’ Clinic was led by CBA Xinjiang Flying Tigers’ head coach Brian Goorjian, and former B.LEAGUE Tochigi Brex head coach Tom Wisman. The clinic also featured former Philippine national player and San Miguel Alab Pilipinas, Jimmy Alapag.

The two-day programme was delivered at the tournament venue, the Macao East Asian Games Dome, from 19 – 20 July 2018. 58 coaches from around the region participated in the clinic, all of whom received Asia League certification following its completion.

References

2018–19 in Asian basketball leagues